Henk van der Linden may refer to:
 Henk van der Linden (footballer)
 Henk van der Linden (filmmaker)